Ellison Bernard Hoover (1888-1955) was an American painter, lithographer and cartoonist.
He is best remembered as an artist for his atmospheric prints of scenes in New York, Paris and elsewhere, “beautiful black and white representations of rural and urban landscapes complemented by faint, ghostly details, leaving much of the viewer’s imagination to wander and fill in ambiguous spaces”.

Personal life and education
Hoover was born in Cleveland, Ohio, to Orlando B. Hoover (1854–1919) and Flora M. Ellison (1857–1926). He studied at the Cleveland School of Art and the Art Students League of New York with Frederick Gottwald and George Bridgman, from whom he learned anatomy, including the drawing of faces.

On November 23, 1926 he married Dorothy Chandler (1898–1954), picture editor of Life Magazine.

Career
Hoover was a syndicated cartoonist for the New York World after studies at the Cleveland School of Art. He also worked for the Newark Evening News and the New York Herald-Tribune, and was a contributor to The New Yorker and the Brooklyn Eagle.

He created political cartoons for Life and Judge magazines in the 1910s and 20s.; "his fat little German-Americans attracted some attention amid the fervid anti-German hysteria preceding and during World War I". His “Cartoons from Life” (Simon and Schuster, 1925) was praised in its forward by Robert Benchly "for standing pat with the tenets of satire at its most realistic … [he] does not represent war by a figure of Mars. He draws life-like portraits of the men who are responsible for war."

In 1925 Hoover provided illustrations for “Barber shop ballads : a book of close harmony”, edited by Sigmund Spaeth

As early as 1928 Hoover created the full page syndicated comic “The Outline of Oscar”. In 1930 he took over drawing the daily syndicated cartoon strip “Mr. and Mrs.” after the death of its creator, cartoonist Clare Briggs. The texts were provided by Art Folwell. Together they created the strip until 1947.

Hoover was successful as a fine artist—in painting, drawings and lithography. A friend, Alexander Hammerslough, describes a one-man gallery show in Martha’s Vineyard "which consisted of his head drawings of many celebrities, including James Cagney." His prints are well known. Multiple copies have survived and can be found in museums, galleries, and at auction. His paintings and drawings are scarce, at least to the public.

Art critic Thomas Craven provided a typed assessment of Hoover’s work for art dealer Jean Bohne:

Exhibitions
From Falk, Peter, “Who Was Who in American Art”, 1953 except as noted
 Mint Museum of Art,1945, 1946
 National Academy of Design, 1944, 1946
 Buck Hill Art Association, Buck Hill Falls, PA, 1945
 Wash. Whatcom Community College [?], 1931, 1944
 Northwest Printmakers, 1944
 Society of American Etchers; Grand Central Gallery, 1945 (one-man show)
 Library of Congress, 1946 (prize)
 Laguna Beacharts Alliance, 1946 (prize)
 Ferargil Galleries, New York, 1949, 1950 (exhibition catalogs, Ferargil Galleries)
 Wellons Galleries, New York, 1952 (exhibition catalog, Wellons Galleries)

Works
Representatives of Hoover's work can be found at
 Amon Carter Museum of American Art
 Fine Arts Museums of San Francisco 
 National Gallery of Art  
 Smithsonian American Art Museum

Archives
Artist’s files for Hoover can be found at
 Frick Art Reference Library of The Frick Collection

References

1888 births
1955 deaths
20th-century American printmakers
American cartoonists
Artists from Cleveland
American lithographers
Painters from Ohio
Art Students League of New York alumni
Cleveland School of Art alumni
20th-century American painters
American male painters
Painters from New York City
20th-century American male artists
20th-century lithographers